Quantum characteristics are phase-space trajectories that arise in the phase space formulation of quantum mechanics through the Wigner transform of Heisenberg operators of canonical coordinates and momenta. These trajectories obey the Hamilton equations in quantum form and play the role of characteristics in terms of which time-dependent Weyl's symbols of quantum operators can be expressed. In the classical limit, quantum characteristics reduce to classical trajectories. The knowledge of quantum characteristics is equivalent to the knowledge of quantum dynamics.

Weyl–Wigner association rule 

In Hamiltonian dynamics, classical systems with  degrees of freedom are described by  canonical coordinates and momenta 
 
that form a coordinate system in the phase space. These variables satisfy the Poisson bracket relations
 
The skew-symmetric matrix ,

where  is the  identity matrix, defines nondegenerate 2-form in the phase space. 
The phase space acquires thereby the structure of a symplectic manifold. The phase space is not metric space, so distance between two points is not defined. The Poisson bracket of two functions can be interpreted as the oriented area of a parallelogram whose adjacent sides are gradients of these functions. 
Rotations in Euclidean space leave the distance between two points invariant. 
Canonical transformations in symplectic manifold leave the areas invariant.

In quantum mechanics, the canonical variables  are associated to operators of canonical coordinates and momenta 

 

These operators act in Hilbert space and obey commutation relations

Weyl’s association rule  extends the correspondence  to arbitrary phase-space functions and operators.

Taylor expansion 

A one-sided association rule  was formulated by Weyl initially with the help of Taylor expansion of functions of operators of the canonical variables

 

The operators  do not commute, so the Taylor expansion is not defined uniquely. The above prescription uses the symmetrized products of the operators. The real functions correspond to the Hermitian operators. The function  is called Weyl's symbol of operator . 

Under the reverse association , the density matrix turns to the Wigner function.
Wigner functions have numerous applications in quantum many-body physics, kinetic theory, collision theory, quantum chemistry.

A refined version of the Weyl–Wigner association rule was proposed by Groenewold and Stratonovich.

Operator basis 

The set of operators acting in the Hilbert space is closed under multiplication of operators by -numbers and summation. Such a set constitutes a vector space . The association rule formulated with the use of the Taylor expansion preserves operations on the operators. The correspondence can be illustrated with the following diagram:

The commonly used Groenewold-Stratonovich basis looks like

The Weyl–Wigner two-sided association rule for function  and operator  has the form

The function  provides coordinates of the operator  in the basis . The basis is complete and orthogonal:

Alternative operator bases are discussed also.

The freedom in choice of the operator basis is better known as the operator ordering problem. The coordinates of particle trajectories in phase space depend on the operator basis.

Star-product 

The set of operators Op(L2(Rn)) is closed under the multiplication of operators. The vector space  is endowed thereby with an associative algebra structure. Given two functions 

one can construct a third function, 

called the -product.
It is given explicitly by

where
 
is the Poisson operator. The -product splits into symmetric and skew-symmetric parts, 

In the classical limit, the -product becomes the dot product. The skew-symmetric part  is known as the Moyal bracket. This is the Weyl symbol of the commutator. In the classical limit, the  Moyal bracket becomes the Poisson bracket. The Moyal bracket is a quantum deformation of the Poisson bracket. The -product is associative, whereas the -product and the Moyal bracket are not associative.

Quantum characteristics 

The correspondence  shows that coordinate transformations in the phase space are accompanied by transformations of operators of the canonical coordinates and momenta and vice versa. Let  be the evolution operator,

and   be the Hamiltonian. Consider the following scheme,

Quantum evolution transforms vectors in the Hilbert space and, under the Wigner association map, coordinates in the phase space. In the Heisenberg representation, the operators of the canonical variables   transform  as 

The phase-space coordinates  that correspond to new operators  in the old basis  are given by

with the initial conditions

The functions   specify the quantum phase flow.

Star-functions 
The set of operators of canonical variables is complete in the sense that any operator can be represented as a function of operators . Transformations 

induce, under the Wigner association rule, transformations of phase-space functions,

Using the Taylor expansion, the transformation of function  under  evolution can be found to be

The composite function defined in such a way is called -function. 

The composition law differs from the classical one.
This equation shows that, given how quantum characteristics are constructed, the physical observables can be found without further  reference to the Hamiltonian. 
The functions  play the role of characteristics, similarly to the classical characteristics used to solve the classical Liouville equation.

The quantum Liouville equation 
The Wigner transform of the evolution equation for the density matrix in the Schrödinger representation leads to a quantum Liouville equation for the Wigner function. The Wigner transform of the evolution equation for operators in the Heisenberg representation,

leads to the same equation with the opposite (plus) sign in the right-hand side:

-function solves this equation in terms of quantum characteristics:

Similarly, the evolution of the Wigner function in the Schrödinger representation is given by 

The Liouville theorem of classical mechanics fails, to the extent that, locally, the phase space volume is not preserved in time. 

The Wigner function represents a quantum system in a more general form than the wave function. Wave functions describe pure states, while the Wigner function characterizes ensembles of quantum states. Any Hermitian operator can be diagonalized: 

. 

Those operators whose eigenvalues  are non-negative and sum to a finite number can be mapped to density matrices, i.e., to some physical states. The Wigner function is an image of the density matrix, so the Wigner functions admit a similar decomposition:

.

Quantum Hamilton's equations 
The Quantum Hamilton's equations can be obtained applying the Wigner transform to the evolution equations for Heisenberg operators of canonical coordinates and momenta,

The right-hand side is calculated like in the classical mechanics. The composite function is, however, -function.

Conservation of Moyal bracket 

The antisymmetrized products of even number of operators of canonical variables are c-numbers as a consequence 
of the commutation relations. 
These products are left invariant by unitary transformations, which leads, in particular, to the relation

 

In general, the antisymmetrized product 

is also invariant, that is, it does not depend on time, and moreover does not depend on the coordinate.

Phase-space transformations induced by the evolution operator preserve the Moyal bracket and do not preserve the Poisson bracket, so the evolution map 

 

is not canonical beyond O(τ). The first order in τ defines the algebra of the transformation group. As previously noted, the algebra of canonical transformations of classical mechanics coincides with the algebra of unitary transformations of quantum mechanics. These two groups, however, are different because the multiplication operations in classical and quantum mechanics are different.

Transformation properties of canonical variables and phase-space functions under unitary transformations in the Hilbert space have important distinctions from the case of canonical transformations in the phase space.

Composition law 

Quantum characteristics can hardly be treated visually as trajectories along which physical particles move. The reason lies in the star-composition law 

which is non-local and is distinct from the dot-composition law of classical mechanics.

Energy conservation 

The energy conservation implies 

where

is Hamilton's function. In the usual geometric sense,  is not conserved along quantum characteristics.

Summary 

The origin of the method of characteristics can be traced back to Heisenberg’s matrix mechanics. 
Suppose that we have solved in the matrix mechanics the evolution equations for the operators of the canonical coordinates and momenta in the
Heisenberg representation. These operators evolve according to 
 
It is known that for any operator  one can find a function  through which
 is represented in the form . The same operator  at time  is equal to

This equation shows that  are
characteristics that determine the evolution for all of the operators in Op(L2(Rn)). 

{| class="wikitable"  style="text-align:center;"
|+ Classical dynamics vs. Quantum dynamics
|-
|-
|colspan="2"| Liouville equation
|-
|colspan="1"| First-order PDE
|colspan="1"| Infinite-order PDE
|-
|-
| | || 
|-
|colspan="2"| Hamilton's equations
|-
|colspan="1"| Finite-order ODE
|colspan="1"| Infinite-order PDE
|-
|-
| | || 
|-
|colspan="1"| Initial conditions
|colspan="1"| Initial conditions
|-
|-
||  
|| 
|-
|colspan="2"| Composition law
|-
|colspan="1"| Dot-composition
|colspan="1"| -composition
|-
|-
|| 
|| 
|-
|colspan="2"| Invariance
|-
|colspan="1"| Poisson bracket
|colspan="1"| Moyal bracket
|-
|-
|| 
|| 
|-
|colspan="2"| Energy conservation
|-
|colspan="1"| Dot-composition
|colspan="1"| -composition
|-
|-
|| 
|| 
|-
|colspan="2"| Solution to Liouville equation
|-
|colspan="1"| Dot-composition
|colspan="1"| -composition
|-
|-
|| 
|| 
|}

Table compares properties of characteristics in classical and quantum mechanics. PDE and ODE indicate partial differential equations and ordinary differential equations, respectively. The quantum Liouville equation is the Weyl–Wigner transform of the von Neumann evolution equation for the density matrix in the Schrödinger representation. The quantum Hamilton equations are the Weyl–Wigner transforms of the evolution equations for operators of the canonical coordinates and momenta in the Heisenberg representation. 

In classical systems, characteristics  usually satisfy first-order ODEs, e.g., classical Hamilton's equations, and solve first-order PDEs, e.g., the classical Liouville equation. Functions  are also characteristics, despite both  and  obeying infinite-order PDEs. 

The quantum phase flow contains all of the information about the quantum evolution. Semiclassical expansion of quantum characteristics and -functions of quantum characteristics in a power series in    allows calculation of the average values of time-dependent physical observables by solving a finite-order coupled system of ODEs for phase space trajectories and Jacobi fields. The order of the system of ODEs depends on the truncation of the power series.
The density of the quantum probability fluid is not preserved in phase-space, as the quantum fluid diffuses. 
Quantum characteristics must be distinguished from 
the trajectories of the De Broglie–Bohm theory, 
the trajectories of the path-integral method in phase space for the amplitudes
and the Wigner function, 
and the Wigner trajectories.
Thus far, only a few quantum systems have been explicitly solved using the method of quantum characteristics.

See also

 Method of characteristics
 Wigner–Weyl transform
 Deformation theory
 Wigner distribution function
 Modified Wigner distribution function
 Wigner quasiprobability distribution
 Negative probability

References

Textbooks 
 H. Weyl, The Theory of Groups and Quantum Mechanics, (Dover Publications, New York Inc., 1931).
 V. I. Arnold, Mathematical Methods of Classical Mechanics, (2-nd ed. Springer-Verlag, New York Inc., 1989).
 M. V. Karasev and V. P. Maslov, Nonlinear Poisson brackets. Geometry and quantization. Translations of Mathematical Monographs, 119. (American Mathematical Society, Providence, RI, 1993).

Partial differential equations